Spectrum is the trade name of Charter Communications, that is used to market consumer and commercial cable television, internet, telephone, and wireless services provided by the company.

The brand was first introduced in 2014; prior to that, these services were marketed primarily under the Charter brand. Following the acquisitions of Time Warner Cable and Bright House Networks by Charter, these operations also merged into the Spectrum brand.

Original programming 

On June 26, 2018, Charter Communications announced it had given L.A.'s Finest a series order for a first season consisting of 13 episodes. The series premiered as the cable service's first original series on May 13, 2019, marking Charter's first foray into original programming.

In August, Curfew and E Is for Edie received pickups. On March 6, 2019, the service picked up a 12-episode eighth season of the 1992-1999 NBC sitcom Mad About You, which premiered six of the episodes on November 20, 2019.

On June 11, 2019,  a series titled Paradise Lost was announced as having received a pickup. On February 19, 2020, it was announced that the series would premiere on April 13, 2020.

On June 26, 2019, the DirecTV Latin America original series Todo por el juego (Everything for the Game) was announced as premiering on Spectrum Originals on July 15, 2019. The original series would be offered, along with an English-dubbed version entitled Side Games.

On January 18, 2020, it was announced that Manhunt: Unabomber would return as Manhunt: Deadly Games and premiere on February 3.

On February 13, 2020, it was announced that the Sky One series Temple would premiere on March 9, 2020.

Internet service

History

Time Warner Cable first launched what would become Road Runner with a 1995 market test in Elmira, New York, under the banner Southern Tier On-Line Community. Later it became known as LineRunner (a moniker subsequently employed by its VoIP service), before Time Warner Cable adopted the Road Runner brand name.

Road Runner High Speed Online employed the Road Runner character from the Road Runner/Wile E. Coyote cartoons (part of the Looney Tunes/Merrie Melodies franchises) distributed by Warner Bros. Pictures as its mascot and brand name. However, in 2012, it was rebranded as simply Time Warner Cable Internet, dropping the Road Runner branding that Time Warner Cable had to license from the now unaffiliated Warner Bros. With Charter's acquisition of Time Warner Cable in May 2016, the service was rebranded as "Spectrum Internet" on September 20, 2016.

Bandwidth caps
Despite raising prices of its Internet service within the previous year, Time Warner Cable announced in February 2009 that it would expand its bandwidth caps and coverage fees into four additional markets by the end of the year.

On April 1, 2009, the cities to have metered billing were announced, which included: Beaumont, Texas; Rochester, New York; Austin, Texas; San Antonio, Texas; and Greensboro, North Carolina.

These metered based billing plans were canceled according to Time Warner Cable "due to customer misunderstanding".

Caps would range from 5 GB to 100 GB with no unlimited option. The bandwidth will include downloads and uploads. If a user goes over, they will be charged $1 per additional gigabyte. Time Warner Cable announced they would provide a meter for users to monitor their usage. The new plan was set to begin in the summer of 2009, however due to protests they had decided against the bandwidth caps. Currently, users have unlimited bandwidth usage given that it does not exceed the predetermined data service maximum as given in the "master agreement". Time Warner Cable would have offered unlimited data for $150/month had the plan continued.

Glenn Britt (1949–2014), CEO from 2001 until December 2013, justified the new billing plans by claiming that the infrastructures had to be continuously upgraded and users would pay for how much they use. In February 2015, a Huffington Post article alleges a 97% profit margin on Time Warner Cable's Internet service.

Facebook groups have been created in protest in addition to an online petition and a Web site dedicated to stop the movement. Other Web sites have been recently following the Time Warner Cable cap plans that were already following broadband Internet providers metering and capping plans.

U.S. Senator Chuck Schumer and Congressman Eric Massa, both of whom represent portions of the Rochester, New York market that would be affected by the changes, announced their opposition to the plan and even went as far as to threaten legislation to ban such a scheme. On April 16, 2009, Time Warner Cable abandoned the plan.

As a condition of the merger with TWC, Spectrum agreed to not impose any bandwidth usage caps for seven years post-merger.

Time Warner Cable Maxx

On January 30, 2014, Time Warner Cable announced its new TWC Maxx initiative in New York City and Los Angeles which substantially boosted service speeds at no additional cost compared to the existing speed tiers, with the highest speed tier tripling from 100 Mbit/s to 300 Mbit/s.

As of mid 2016, TWC Maxx upgrades have been completed in New York City up the Hudson Valley, Los Angeles, Austin, Kansas City, Dallas, San Antonio, Raleigh, Hawaii, and Charlotte. Rollouts of TWC Maxx were in progress in San Diego, Greensboro, and Wilmington and were completed in early 2016.

After the TWC acquisition by Charter in June 2016, TWC Maxx upgrades have indefinitely been put on hold.

Spectrum Internet
After its merger with TWC and Bright House Networks, Charter Spectrum started offering broadband Internet plans across its entire service area. In December 2017, Charter began its rollout of DOCSIS 3.1, initially in early TWC Maxx markets, which increased speeds and added a gigabit tier. As of April 2020, most of the Spectrum footprint has Spectrum Internet Gig available and starting base speeds depend by area which at one point will all be upgraded to 200/10 Mbit/s in the near future.

Mobile services

Road Runner Mobile (defunct)
In late 2009 after splitting off from Time Warner (now WarnerMedia), Time Warner Cable began reselling Clearwire mobile WiMAX service as Road Runner Mobile, bundled with the company's existing broadband, TV and VoIP services. In October 2009, the company indicated that they'd be launching their incarnation of the service starting December 1 in Raleigh, Durham, Cary, Chapel Hill, Charlotte and Greensboro, and later, Dallas, San Antonio, Austin, Honolulu, and Maui. 

As of late 2011, Time Warner Cable stopped signing up new Road Runner Mobile customers under resold Clearwire WiMAX service. Existing WiMAX customers could continue to use the service, but TWC began signing up new Road Runner Mobile customers under resold Verizon Wireless 4G LTE services. As of late 2012, however, all mentions of Time Warner Cable-branded mobile broadband services have been removed from Time Warner Cable's website and most regional franchises, and eventually, those customers were transitioned directly to Verizon.

Spectrum Mobile
On June 30, 2018, Charter launched Spectrum Mobile, a mobile virtual network operator service. Spectrum utilizes their service area's Wi-Fi network for extended network coverage, while Verizon Wireless provides the network Spectrum Mobile utilizes for mobile service, both a traditional 4G network and newer 5G network.

Controversy

Spectrum Strike 

On May 23, 2017, about 1,800 Spectrum workers went on strike in New York City, following the company's efforts to take control of workers health insurance and pension plans. The strike, which remains ongoing as of October 2021, is currently the longest strike in United States history. Spectrum has refused to negotiate with the workers' union, the International Brotherhood of Electrical Workers (IBEW) Local 3, instead, hiring a large temporary workforce of strikebreakers, and attempted to launch a vote to decertify IBEW Local 3. Spectrum's efforts to decertify the union has faced legal challenge, including a March 2020 decision by the National Labor Relations Board, which found "a serious and substantial issue" regarding Spectrum's efforts to decertify the union.

New York State 
In 2018, Charter agreed to a $174 million fine with the state of New York, in lieu of the state completely revoking its franchise to operate throughout the state, which would have inconvenienced much of the state's residential and commercial operations. According to New York State, Charter did not provide new high-speed internet service to as many homes as they had promised during merger discussions with Time Warner Cable.

References

External links

Broadband
Charter Communications
Internet service providers of the United States
Companies based in Stamford, Connecticut